The China national baseball team is the national representative team of the People's Republic of China.

Results and fixtures 
The following is a list of professional baseball match results currently active in the latest version of the WBSC World Rankings, as well as any future matches that have been scheduled.

Legend

2019

2023

Current roster

Uniforms

Olympic Games

China secured qualification to the 2008 Summer Olympics automatically as host nation, giving the country its first Olympics berth.

World Baseball Classic

China competed in the inaugural 2006 World Baseball Classic and finished 15th in the tournament. It also competed in the 2009 World Baseball Classic, managed by Terry Collins. In the 2009 tournament, China recorded a 4–1 win over Chinese Taipei but was eliminated after losses to Japan and South Korea.

Results

International

Asian

References

Sources

Baseball America
2006 World Baseball Classic

Baseball in China
National baseball teams in Asia
Baseball